Thomas Thomas (29 August 1917 – 31 October 1998) was the first cardio-thoracic surgeon of Indian citizenship, as well as a prolific author and poet.

Life
He was trained by Reeve H. Betts in cardio-thoracic surgery at the
Christian Medical College in Vellore, India.
He studied at Madras Christian College, Tamil Nadu, and did his medical training at Stanley Medical College, Tamil Nadu. He was the first surgeon in South Asia to do a mitral valvulotomy.

He was awarded a Rockefeller Fellowship and did further medical research in London and Edinburgh. He later taught in hospitals in Karnataka, Kerala, Papua New Guinea, and Libya.

A prolific writer, he funded his medical studies by writing short stories that were published in the literary magazine Caravan.

He wrote poetry, short stories and several novels. Several of these are set in Kerala. His non-medical works include a book on Sister Alphonsa. This book played a role in helping the case for her canonisation. His poetry has been read on the radio in Sydney, Australia. In his later years, his poetry dealt with the themes of blindness and the nature of an expatriate's identity.

His medical publications include "Results of Resection for Pulmonary Tuberculosis", Indian Journal of Tuberculosis Vol. III, New Delhi, March, 1956. No. 3.

He died at the age of 81 in Sydney.

Notes

1917 births
1998 deaths
Indian surgeons
Indian medical writers
Malayali people
Medical doctors from Kerala
Rockefeller Fellows
20th-century Indian medical doctors